is a 1955 black-and-white Japanese film directed by Kimiyoshi Yasuda.

Cast
 Ichikawa Raizō VIII

References

External links

Japanese black-and-white films
1955 films
Films directed by Kimiyoshi Yasuda
Daiei Film films
Japanese drama films
1955 drama films
1950s Japanese films